NHL 2001 is a video game released by Electronic Arts in 2000. It is the successor to NHL 2000. An add-on featuring Elitserien and SM-Liiga was released on the PC version on March 8, 2001, that added Swedish and Finnish hockey leagues and teams to the game. It is the tenth installment of the NHL series, the final to be released on PlayStation, and the first to be released on PlayStation 2.

Features
Jim Hughson remains as play-by-play announcer in the game, with Bill Clement joining as an analyst for a second time, debuting in the previous edition, NHL 2000. This is also the first NHL game to appear on the PlayStation 2 and also to include Latvia and Ukraine to the 18 national teams first featured in NHL 98 (only available in the PC and PlayStation 2 versions). There is also a brand new feature called the Momentum Bar, which goes to the team who has scored goals, done big hits, etc.

Elitserien and SM-Liiga expansion pack 
An expansion pack for the PC version of NHL 2001 including the Swedish and Finnish elite leagues was released in early 2001, titled Elitserien 2001 (SM-Liiga 2001 in Finland). It includes all 12 teams from Elitserien and all 13 teams from SM-Liiga at the time. It also includes new intro play-by-play by Arne Hegerfors in Swedish, and Mika Saukkonen in Finnish. And new arena announcers by Magnus Gustafsson in Swedish, and Pentti Lindegren in Finnish. The cover athlete on Elitserien 2001 is Henrik Zetterberg of Timrå IK, and the cover athlete on SM-Liiga 2001 is Raimo Helminen of Ilves.

Reception

The PC version received "universal acclaim", while the PlayStation and PlayStation 2 versions received "generally favorable reviews", according to the review aggregation website Metacritic. Emmett Schkloven of X-Play gave the PS2 version four stars out of five and stated, "EA has spent a lot of effort making NHL 2001 accessible to newcomers and non-hockey fanatics. Easier controls, clean gameplay and a fast, slick interface all contribute to the company's success in this endeavor. Fortunately, the depth and realism that make hockey lovers like myself such fans of the franchise have not been sacrificed. The game is not as flawless as it could be, but it is damn close. And it's still only launch year." Jim Preston of NextGen said, "EA's first NHL effort on Playstation 2 [sic] is almost as deep as it is pretty."

Clayton Crooks of AllGame gave the PC version four-and-a-half stars out of five and said, "Hockey fans are sure to enjoy NHL 2001. It offers impressive (albeit repetitive) audio, superb graphics and animation to go along with exciting gameplay and fans of both arcade and simulation-style sports games should be able to find some aspect to enjoy. Online play, customizable rosters that are available for download from the Internet and multiple season modes make this a game that should occupy the hard drive for a long time, at least until the next version is released." Matt Grandstaff of the same website gave the PlayStation version four stars, saying that it was "a better game than its PS2 counterpart. Even though it lacks some of the many customizations available in the PS2 version and is an ugly duckling in comparison, gamers looking for the most authentic hockey action for the 2000-2001 season should go with the PS version -- even if they own a PS2." However, Terry Chung gave the PS2 version three stars, calling it "a worthy attempt at bringing the series to a 128-bit system, but with a few minor problems that need to be worked out, it should have been sent down to the minors for some reconditioning before coming back up."

Kevin "BIFF" Giacobbi of GameZone gave the PC version a perfect ten, calling it "a must have". Kevin Krause later gave the PlayStation 2 version 9.3 out of 10, calling it "a great game overall and the innovative new features put it yet another step ahead of the pack. My recommendation? Pick this one up!"

The PS2 version was a runner-up for GameSpots annual "Best PlayStation 2 Game" award, which went to SSX. In the same way the PC version was a runner-up for the website's annual "Sports Game of the Year" award, which went to FIFA 2001. The same PC version won the award for Sports Game of the Year at the CNET Gamecenter Computer Game Awards for 2000. The staff of Computer Games Magazine nominated the same PC version for their 2000 "Sports Game of the Year" award, whose winner remains unknown. It was a runner-up for "Sports Game of 2000" in both Editors' Choice and Readers' Choice at IGNs Best of 2000 Awards.

Notes

References

External links

2000 video games
Electronic Arts games
PlayStation (console) games
PlayStation 2 games
Windows games
NHL (video game series)
EA Sports games
Video games scored by Mike Reagan
Video games scored by Rom Di Prisco
Video games set in 2000
Video games set in 2001
Video games set in the United States
Video games set in Canada
Video games developed in Canada
Multiplayer and single-player video games